The Ravine of Death or Cage of Death (German:Die Schlucht des Todes) is a 1923 German silent thriller film directed by Luciano Albertini, Albert-Francis Bertoni and Max Obal. It starred Albertini, Lya De Putti and Hermann Picha.

Cast
 Luciano Albertini as Manuelo - cowboy  
 Lya De Putti as Rosita - his wife  
 Hermann Picha as Baron Alleardi  
 Heinz Sarnow as Count Giani  
 Gertrude Hoffman as Countess Gabriela

References

Bibliography
 Bock, Hans-Michael & Bergfelder, Tim. The Concise CineGraph. Encyclopedia of German Cinema. Berghahn Books, 2009.

External links

1923 films
Films of the Weimar Republic
Films directed by Max Obal
German silent feature films
German thriller films
German black-and-white films
1920s thriller films
Phoebus Film films
Silent thriller films
1920s German films